"Without a Fight" is a song recorded by American country music artist Brad Paisley, featuring American pop artist Demi Lovato. It was released on May 13, 2016 by Arista Nashville. Paisley co-wrote the song with Kelley Lovelace and Lee Thomas Miller, and co-produced it with Luke Wooten. Originally believed to be a release from Paisley's then-upcoming album Love and War, the song did not make the final track list. The song also won a Teen Choice Award in 2016.

Chart performance
"Without a Fight" peaked at number 16 on the Billboard Country Airplay chart for the week of August 20, 2016. It peaked at number 23 on the US Hot Country Songs chart for the week of July 16, 2016. As of July 2016, the song has sold 61,000 copies in the US.

Music video
A lyric video for the song was released on YouTube via Paisley's official Vevo channel on May 13, 2016 which features behind-the-scenes footage of the song's recording process. The official music video for the song was released on June 17, 2016.

Live performances
Lovato joined Paisley to perform the song at the Irvine Meadows Amphitheatre on May 20, 2016. Lovato and Paisley made their television performance debut of the song at Jimmy Kimmel Live! on May 24.

Charts

Weekly charts

Year-end charts

References

2016 songs
2016 singles
Brad Paisley songs
Demi Lovato songs
Male–female vocal duets
Songs written by Brad Paisley
Songs written by Kelley Lovelace
Songs written by Lee Thomas Miller
Arista Nashville singles